Sri Lanka competed at the 2015 World Championships in Athletics in Beijing, China, from 22–30 August 2015.

Results
Track and road events
(q – qualified, NM – no mark, SB – season best)
Sri Lanka qualified two marathon runners.

References 

Nations at the 2015 World Championships in Athletics
World Championships in Athletics
Sri Lanka at the World Championships in Athletics